Nicola Lauren Olyslagers (née McDermott) (born 28 December 1996) is an Australian high jumper. Olyslagers won the silver medal at the Tokyo 2020 Olympics in the high jump and is the current high jump Oceanian record holder.

Career
Olyslagers competed in the women's high jump at the 2017 World Championships in Athletics. Olyslagers also competed in the women's high jump at the 2018 Commonwealth Games, where she achieved a personal best jump of 1.91m and won the bronze medal. On 20 June 2019, Olyslagers jumped a personal best of 1.96m at Mestský Stadion, Ostrava, Czech Republic. Achieving a new personal best of 1.98 m in Sinn, Germany, on 29 August 2020, she rose to second place in the all-time list of Australian women high jumpers.

Olyslagers set Australian and Oceanian records with a personal best 2.00 m jump on 18 April 2021. She improved her personal best to 2.01 in Stockholm on 4 July 2021 and to 2.02 at the Tokyo Olympics on 7 August 2021, winning silver.

International competitions

Personal life
Olyslagers is of maternal Croatian ancestry, hailing from the island of Korčula. Olyslagers had always been tall for her age, and says that she was not good at sports in her early years due to a lack of coordination. After she was introduced to athletics at school at age of seven and won the majority of the events from shotput to 200m, her parents got her involved with Little Athletics.

She studied biochemistry at the University of Sydney. Her sports idol is Blanka Vlašić.

Olyslagers is a devout evangelical Christian, and is a member of a Pentecostal denomination that she prefers not to name.  She became a Christian while attending a youth camp at the age of 16, compared experiencing the Holy Spirit "tangibly" to "electricity" going through her body, as if "colour" had come to a world she'd been seeing "in black and white".

She has said that she made a conscious decision to be very public about her Christian faith, which she says is more important to her than her sport.  She described this in an interview as follows: "In 2017 was my big moment when it flicked the switch, and I decided to pursue God over sport – whatever comes from sport is a bonus, but I am already complete  and perfect and loved as a person regardless of it. That just allowed me to soar over every high jump bar and not be scared anymore because I am loved, and that is the most important thing."

Her inspiration often comes from Bible verses and inspirational messages that she writes on her wrist. She has stated that no gold medal could bring lasting satisfaction to her heart, and that being loved by God rather than her performance determines her identity; this is the reason she says she keeps the focus on making her identity outside of sport.

Olyslagers runs Everlasting Crowns, a ministry dedicated to encouraging and teaching athletes.

She married Rhys Olyslagers in April 2022, and since then has competed as Nicola Olyslagers.

References

External links
 

1996 births
Living people
Australian female high jumpers
World Athletics Championships athletes for Australia
Place of birth missing (living people)
University of Sydney alumni
Commonwealth Games medallists in athletics
Commonwealth Games bronze medallists for Australia
Athletes (track and field) at the 2018 Commonwealth Games
Australian Athletics Championships winners
Australian biochemists
Australian evangelicals
Australian Pentecostals
Australian people of Croatian descent
Athletes (track and field) at the 2020 Summer Olympics
Medalists at the 2020 Summer Olympics
Olympic silver medalists in athletics (track and field)
Olympic silver medalists for Australia
Olympic athletes of Australia
People from the Central Coast (New South Wales)
Medallists at the 2018 Commonwealth Games